Moxie, stylized as MOXiE! is a 2021 American comedy-drama film directed by Amy Poehler. Tamara Chestna and Dylan Meyer adapted the screenplay from the 2017 novel of the same name by Jennifer Mathieu. It stars Hadley Robinson, Alycia Pascual-Peña, Lauren Tsai, Patrick Schwarzenegger, Nico Hiraga, and Poehler. The film focuses on 16-year-old Vivian (played by Hadley Robinson), who starts a feminist zine to empower the young women in her high school, as they contend with bullying, sexual harassment, and rape. The film was released on March 3, 2021 by Netflix and received mixed reviews from critics.

Plot
Vivian is 16, lives with her mother, Lisa, and attends Rockport High School. One day she joins her best friend Claudia at a class taught by Mr. Davies. Vivian notices a classmate, Seth, who has gotten more attractive over the summer. Earlier he used to be called Seth "The Shrimp". Mr. Davies introduces a new student, Lucy, then begins a discussion of The Great Gatsby, a novel about a mysterious millionaire. Lucy criticizes it as another tale of a rich white guy expressing sorrow over not having the woman he wants. The star jock Mitchell interrupts Lucy's opinion and defends the Jay Gatsby character.

Later, Vivian sees Mitchell taking the soda Lucy was trying to buy and spitting in it. Lucy reports Mitchell to Principal Shelly, who doesn't want to penalize Mitchell and tries to avoid getting involved.

At home, Vivian goes through Lisa's stuff and finds her old feminist zines and gets inspired. Next day at school, the students discover a list of young women made by a group of jocks being sent to everyone's phone. Many girls are embarrassed by the list, in which the jocks express many sexist and perverse opinions, which makes the girls self-conscious. When Mitchell calls Lucy a foul word, Vivian becomes inspired by her feminist mother  and starts "Moxie", a zine aimed at calling out the unfair treatment of girls at the school, and empowering them to raise their concerns.

Vivian befriends Lucy, as well as a group of other girls who have been put down, but her best friend Claudia is reluctant to get behind the movement and it causes a rift between them. Vivian also begins a relationship with Seth, who knows she started "Moxie" and supports her.

After Mitchell wins an athletic award over the girls' favorite candidate, Kiera, Vivian walks home feeling depressed, drinking a bottle of champagne along the way. She comes home to find Lisa with her boyfriend, John, and is annoyed that her mother kept this relationship a secret from her. Vivian then throws up.

Later, the "Moxie" girls respond to Mitchell winning the award by putting crude stickers all over the school. Principal Shelly, who was called out by "Moxie" for not supporting the girls, attempts to shut down the group. Claudia, who eventually joined the group, takes the fall for the stickers.

Vivian then hits a low point when Claudia criticizes her for not coming forward (she knew Vivian started "Moxie"), while also having a rough patch with Seth. She also faces challenges with her mother after she yells at Lisa and John during dinner.

Vivian finds a note from an anonymous girl who claimed to have been raped the previous year. Vivian gets "Moxie" supporters to stage a walkout in support of the girl. The majority of students walk out, and Vivian reveals that she started "Moxie".

Head cheerleader Emma comes forward as the girl who wrote the note, stating that Mitchell, her ex-boyfriend, was her rapist. She stands up and reveals to everyone that Mitchell raped her the previous year when they were dating, and called her "Most Bangable", which left her mortified. All the students are horrified and lend their support. Principal Shelly overhears and plans to punish Mitchell at last.

Vivian reconciles with her mom, Claudia, and Seth, and "Moxie" gains more followers. Lisa expresses pride in her daughter and the girls throw a party in celebration of "Moxie".

Cast

Production
In February 2019, it was announced Amy Poehler would direct the film, from a screenplay by Tamara Chestna, and serve as a producer under her Paper Kite Productions banner, with Netflix distributing. In October 2019, Hadley Robinson, Lauren Tsai, Patrick Schwarzenegger, and Ike Barinholtz joined the cast of the film. In November 2019, Josephine Langford, Marcia Gay Harden, and Clark Gregg joined the cast of the film.

Filming
Principal photography began in October 2019 in Arcadia, California.

Release
The film was released on March 3, 2021 on Netflix.

Reception
On review aggregator Rotten Tomatoes, the film has an approval rating of 70% based on 114 reviews, with an average rating of 6.5/10. The website's critics consensus reads, "Moxie comes up a little short on its titular ingredient when it comes to fully addressing its story's timely themes, but this sweet coming-of-age story is still easy to like." On Metacritic, it has a weighted average score of 54 out of 100 based on 25 critics, indicating "mixed or average reviews".

Rasha Jameel, writing in The Daily Star, accused the film of tokenism. Criticizing its "careless" insertion of the "white savior" trope, Jameel wrote, "the film adds characters of colour and a white character with disability, but instead of allowing these characters to speak or act on their behalf, the narrative is told primarily through the all-too-common perspective of a privileged white American."

References

External links
 

2021 films
2021 comedy-drama films
2020s feminist films
American comedy-drama films
American high school films
Films based on American novels
English-language Netflix original films
Films shot in Los Angeles
American female buddy films
2020s female buddy films
2020s English-language films
2020s American films